Donald Nielsen Jr. (born October 18, 1951) is an American biathlete. He competed at the 1980 Winter Olympics and the 1984 Winter Olympics.

References

1951 births
Living people
American male biathletes
Olympic biathletes of the United States
Biathletes at the 1980 Winter Olympics
Biathletes at the 1984 Winter Olympics
People from New London, New Hampshire
20th-century American people